Rennie is a town community in New South Wales, Australia.  It is in the south-east of the Riverina about 10 kilometres south of Savernake and 19 kilometres from Mulwala.

Rennie Post Office opened on 1 February 1937 and closed in 1989.

Rennie is home to Rennie Football Club, playing in the Picola & District Football League.

Transport 

Rennie is served by a broad gauge branch of the Victorian Railways which extends to Oaklands, New South Wales and has been converted to standard gauge to meet the North East Railway.

Notes

External links 

Rennie Rail Siding Photos

Towns in the Riverina
Federation Council, New South Wales